The Morgan Roadster is a model produced by the Morgan Motor Company. It was introduced in 2004 replacing the Morgan Plus 8. The car is identical to its predecessor except for new modern Ford V6 mechanicals. The new engine develops similar power, though less torque, and is slightly lighter than the Rover V8 which results in increased performance and better fuel economy. Air conditioning is now standard on U.S. models. Like its predecessor, the chassis consists of a standard ladder frame design and is built from galvanised steel with five tubular or box section cross members. The body is built of steel and aluminum around an ash frame. Suspension is traditional Morgan slider type up-front and solid axle / leaf spring at the rear.

Unlike its predecessor, the Roadster was available as a 2-seater or a 4-seater.

The standard colour range is Royal Ivory, Corsa Red, Indigo Blue, Connaught Green, and Black, but any single colour or two-tone combination from the ICI Autocolour range is available as an option.

Specification

Weight 	
Kerb weight, kg (actual dependent on spec.)	:  (lowline)
Ground clearance (average) (driver and passenger)	: 
Maximum total weight including passengers and luggage	:

Fuel 	
Fuel tank capacity 	: 
Fuel consumption :
Urban:	        
Extra urban:	
Combined:	
CO2:	231.8 g/km

Wheels	
Standard bolt on alloy wheels (5 stud) 6.5" x 15" (205/55/16 tyres)
Optional 100% stainless wire wheels 72 spoke 7" x 16" (205/55/16 tyres)

Steering 	
Turning circle m/ft	: 9.75/32
Turns lock to lock	: 3 rack and pinion
Steering column	: Collapsible safety top section with combined lock
Steering wheel	: 15" standard, 14" nco, 16" with offset centre for airbag markets

Transmission 	
mph/1000 rpm (top gear)	                : 23.67
mph at 2500 ft/min, piston speed (theoretical)	: 113.6
Final drive ratio	        : 3.08
Overall gearing in top gear	: 3.06:1

Indirect ratios:	
1st gear	: 4.23
2nd gear	: 2.52
3rd gear	: 1.67
4th gear	: 1.22
5th gear	: 1
Reverse	: 3.51

Clutch	
Single dry plate

Rear axle
Tubular live axle with hypoid gears and limited slip.

Suspension 	
Front: 	Independent sliding pillar with coil springs and gas filled telescopic shock absorbers
Rear: 	Semi-elliptic leaf springs with gas telescopic shock absorbers
Toe in: 	0–3 mm or 0-30

Engine 	
Model: Ford Cyclone V6
Configuration:	3.7 litre V6 24 valve
Bore x stroke, mm:	95.5 x 86.6
Engine capacity, cc:	3721
Max output EEC: 209 kW (280 hp) at 6000
Max torque EEC:	380 N·m 280 (lbf·ft)
Power-to-weight ratio:	295 bhp / tonne

Fuel System
Minimum octane rating 95 Ron
Electronic fuel injection. Sealed evaporative control system through charcoal canister. Tubular stainless manifolds (headers) to stainless steel twin exhaust with catalysts.

Brakes 	
Front	: AP Lockheed 4 pot calipers, 28 cm/11" disc brakes
Rear	: 23 cm/9" drum
Operation	: Hydraulic dual circuit with servo assistance
Handbrake	: Sports "Fly-off" type

Performance 	
0 – 100 km/h (62 mph): 5.5 seconds
Top speed: 140 mph (215 km/h)

References

External links

Official Morgan Website
Roadster Information
GoMoG Roadster Information

Roadster
Roadsters
Cars introduced in 2004
2010s cars
2020s cars
Retro-style automobiles